Lancen Joudo is an Australian former professional rugby league footballer who was last contracted to the North Queensland Cowboys in the National Rugby League. Son of Laurence and Arabella Joudo.

Early life
During his junior and youth career, he played for the St Clair Comets and won representative honours with New South Wales Under 17's, and Australia Under 15's. He also previously played as a junior for the Penrith Panthers.

Playing career
Joudo made his first grade début in the 2009 NRL season in a round 23 56-10 defeat at home to Wests Tigers, where he came on off the bench. He again started on the bench in his second appearance of the season, in a 20-10 away loss to the Gold Coast Titans.

Joudo worked at Bentley Park College as a truancy officer for a brief time. On his departure, Joudo stated that he felt like he was a part of the 'Bentley Park Family'.

References

1989 births
Living people
Australian rugby league players
Cronulla-Sutherland Sharks players
Northern Pride RLFC players
Rugby league hookers
Rugby league players from New South Wales
Wentworthville Magpies players